The FX-702P is a Pocket Computer, manufactured by Casio from 1981 to 1984.

Display
The FX-702P features a single line dot matrix liquid crystal display with 20 characters.  A 10-digit mantissa is displayed (including minus sign) however internal calculations use a 12-digit mantissa.

Programming
The programming model employed is a special BASIC dialect.  Ten programming areas are supported, P0 through P9.  BASIC lines can be numbered from 1 through to 9999.  Subroutines are supported, but passing parameters to subroutines is not supported.  The subroutine call stack can be up to 10 deep.  Both GOTO lines and subroutines can be addressed indirectly via line number calculation.  FOR/NEXT structures can be nested up to eight times.

A single one and/or two dimensional array is supported however array memory space must be reserved (subtracted) from the 1,680 character program space via the DEFM command.  Array memory can be aliased to fixed variable names, for example A(11) references the same location as variable B1.

Both programs and data can be stored to magnetic tape.  Data can be stored under program control.  Programs can be password protected from both listing and execution.

Interface

The FX-702P uses the FA-2 interface which is also used by the Casio FX-602P series. The interface features a Kansas City standard Compact Cassette interface and printer port for the FP-10 thermal printer. The printer can also be connected directly to the calculator.

The FP-10 Spark printer was used with the FX-602P series of programmable calculator and the FX-702P Pocket Computer to print out programs, data register and display content. Although the feature was not documented, the FP-10 can also be used with the FX-502P series and was able to print out programs in Key-code notation.

References

External links
 The Casio FX-702P computer on the pocket computer museum
 Casio FX-702P on Caz Pocket Computers Collection
 FX-702P on RS-Key maintained by Viktor Toth.
 casio fx-702p on Voidware
 ledudu's page on fx-702p and sisters on the ledudu's Casio library

FX-702P
Pocket computers
Products introduced in 1981